Darcy Allen Jech (born September 30, 1957) is a Republican member of the Oklahoma State Senate, representing the 26th district. He was initially elected in November 2014. A graduate of Southeastern Oklahoma State University, he earned a B. S. degree. He is now a businessman and owns an independent insurance agency in his hometown of Kingfisher, Oklahoma He won re-election in 2018 without opposition for a new term, to end in 2022.

References

Living people
Republican Party Oklahoma state senators
People from Kingfisher, Oklahoma
1957 births
Southeastern Oklahoma State University alumni
21st-century American politicians